The 27 October 2003 Baghdad bombings were a series of suicide car bombings targeting the Red Cross headquarters and four Iraqi police stations in Baghdad. The attacks killed 34 people and injured another 224.

The bombings began at approximately 8:30 am. All occurred within about 45 minutes of each other, and were also set to occur on the first day of Ramadan. Four suicide bombers died but the fifth and sixth, both Syrians, attempted to blow up a fourth police station, but had their plan foiled after their car apparently failed to explode. One was killed and the other was wounded by the Iraqi police and arrested. A grenade was set off by the Syrians, wounding one of themselves along with an officer.

References

External links 
Up to 40 Killed, 200 Injured in Series of Baghdad Bombings
DEADLY ATTACKS 
Baghdad Hotel Bombing, March 17, 2004
Bloody day in Baghdad, dozens killed in car bombs

Bombings, 27 October 2003
Baghdad bombings, 27 October
Baghdad bombings, 27 October
2003 bombings
21st-century mass murder in Iraq
Baghdad bombings, 27 October
2003 bombings
Baghdad, 27 October 2003
International Red Cross and Red Crescent Movement
Mass murder in 2003
2003 bombings
Baghdad bombings
Baghdad bombings
Baghdad bombings, 27 October
2003
Suicide car and truck bombings in Iraq
Baghdad bombings, 27 October
Building bombings in Iraq